The glenolabral articular disruption (GLAD) lesion is a type of shoulder injury.  It is difficult to diagnose clinically, and requires surgical repair to correct the damage to the shoulder.

References

Upper limb anatomy
Joints